The Lawrence School, Sanawar, is the oldest Co-Ed boarding school in the world near Solan city. Established in 1847, its history, influence, and wealth have made it one of the most prestigious and oldest schools in Asia.

It is located in the Kasauli Hills, District Solan, Himachal Pradesh, India. Sanawar is about an hour's drive from Chandigarh. The school, founded by Sir Henry Lawrence and his wife Honoria, is one of the oldest surviving boarding schools.

As the school is located in Sanawar, the school is popularly called "Sanawar". It is situated at a height of 1,750 metres and spread over an area of 139 acres, heavily forested with pine, deodar and other conifer trees. The school has been ranked among the best residential schools of India. In May 2013 Sanawar created history by becoming the first school in the world to send a team of seven students and climb Mount Everest. The motto of the school is "Never Give In".

Sanawar is affiliated to India's Central Board of Secondary Education. Children are admitted to Sanawar in February each year, at the age of nine and ten years. Class Five (Lower III) is preferred as the entry point. Admission is based on a competitive entrance examination, held the preceding November, followed by an interview.

In the school's name, "Sanawar" is the name of the hill on which it stands. The nearest railway station is now usually spelt "Sonwara". Sanawar is believed to be the oldest mixed-sex boarding school anywhere in the world.

Henry Lawrence's intent was to provide for the education of the orphans of British soldiers and other poor white children. In 1845 he outlined the creation of a boarding school in the Indian highlands for boys and girls. He stated his aim as being to create 

The school at Sanawar was established as the first such asylum on 15 April 1847, when fourteen girls and boys arrived at Sanawar in the charge of Lawrence's sister-in-law Charlotte Lawrence, wife of George Lawrence, and a superintendent Healey. The school was co-educational from its beginning. The site had been chosen by Lawrence, after discussions with William Hodson and others, considering that it was an "ideal location" which "afforded the necessary requisites: isolation, ample space, water, a good altitude, and all not too far from British troops". The construction of the buildings was paid for by Lawrence and other British officers, with a large contribution from Gulab Singh, the first Maharaja of the princely state of Jammu and Kashmir. Hodson, who later became famous for Hodson's Horse, supervised the construction of the school's first buildings and is still commemorated by the annual Hodson's Run, a competition between the school's houses. In the early days some Anglo-Indian children were admitted, but Lawrence insisted that preference should be given to those of "pure European" parentage, as he considered they were more likely to suffer from the heat of the plains.

Under its first professional headmaster, W. J. Parker, who was appointed in 1848, the school was known as "Lawrence's Asylum", reflecting its focus on orphans. In 1858 it was renamed the "Lawrence Royal Military School".

By 1853, the school had grown to 195 pupils when it was presented with the King's Colour, one of only seven schools and colleges ever to be so honoured in the British Empire, the others being Eton, Shrewsbury, Cheltenham, the Duke of York's Royal Military School the Royal Military College, Sandhurst and the Lawrence School, Lovedale. Sanawar has held its colour for the longest unbroken period.

The tradition of military training at Sanawar has always been strong and was of such a high standard that several contingents of boys were enlisted from the school and sent straight to the battlefields of the First World War. In appreciation of this, the school was redesignated in 1920 as the "Lawrence Royal Military School" and, in 1922, the Prince of Wales presented the school with new Colours. This pattern of military service was repeated again during the Second World War and, according to a BBC Radio broadcast on 3 October 1941, more than two hundred Sanawarians had joined up. The school Colour continues to this day to be trooped at the Founders' Celebration in early October, and Sanawar pupils continue to make a major contribution to the defence of the country.

In its first two decades, the school suffered an unexpectedly high death rate, with forty children dying between 1848 and 1858, of whom thirteen were the victims of an outbreak of cholera in 1857. In the next ten years, there were seventy-two further deaths, and in 1870 a Punjab Medical Department report proposed measures to improve the school's sanitation, as well as "a separate hospital for the treatment of contagious diseases". The headmaster, John Cole, was inspired to write a book called Notes on Hygiene with Hints on Self-discipline for Young Soldiers in India (1882).

Sanawar's centenary year (1947) was crucial to the development of the school. With Indian independence, the bulk of the staff and children at Sanawar returned to Britain. However, the then-Governor General, Lord Mountbatten, presided at the centenary celebrations and read out a message from King George VI. Thereafter, control of the school passed from the Crown to the government of India's Ministry of Defence. A further transfer in 1949 brought the school under the control of the Ministry of Education. In June 1952 the ministry resolved to administer the school through a society created under the Societies Registration Act 1860, subject to a Memorandum of Association and rules and regulations to be approved by the government. These provided that the government Secretaries in the Ministries of Education, Defence, and Finance would serve as ex-officio members of the society, with four other members appointed by the government. The employees of the school, previously government servants, lost that status. The property and other assets of the school, which then had an estimated value of twenty-five lakhs of rupees, were transferred to the society with effect from June 1954.

The school celebrated its 150th anniversary in 1997, and India marked the occasion with a two-rupee commemorative postage stamp issued in October 1997 and inscribed "1847-1997 THE LAWRENCE SCHOOL SANAWAR".

Present day
 In 2003, The Tribune described it as one of about half a dozen elite public schools in India, catering for "an upwardly mobile landed and commercial elite". It is an international member of the Headmasters' and Headmistresses' Conference, based in England.

Together with some other leading Indian schools, including The Doon School, The Daly College, Mayo College, the Scindia School, Rajkumar College, and Baldwin Boys High School, Sanawar is a member of the Round Square Conference, a worldwide association of some eighty schools which exchange students with each other. Other member schools include Aiglon College in Switzerland, Ballarat Grammar School in Australia, Deerfield Academy and Chadwick School in the United States, Wellington in England, and Gordonstoun in Scotland.

The school honours its original purpose by continuing to offer a reduction in fees for the children of military families. About a quarter of the boarders are the sons and daughters of former pupils. Till recently, as part of its annual Founder's Day celebrations, attended by many Old Sanawarians, the school continued to troop the Royal colours. Until 1990, a significant number of school-leavers continued to join the armed forces but there has been a sharp decline in this tradition, and in 2011 one Old Sanawarian brigadier was quoted in The Times of India as saying that in his day "the main aim was to join the forces, but now hardly anyone is interested in doing so".

Sanawar is divided into four houses—Himalaya, Nilagiri, Siwalik and Vindhya. The houses compete with each other at activities such as cricket, cross country running, debating and many other activities.

A group of Sanawarians have entered the record books as they are the youngest team and the first school in the world to have conquered Mt. Everest. These teenagers ranged between the ages of 15 and 16. One of the climbers is the youngest Asian and the second-youngest person in the world to scale Mt. Everest.

Principals and headmasters

 1848—1863: W. J. Parker
 1864—1884: J. Cole
 1884—1912: A. H. Hildersley
 1912—1932: Rev. G. D. Barne, later Bishop of Lahore
 1932—1933: E.S. Hunt
 1933—1941: A.E. Evans
 1941—1946: C.G O'Hagan
 1946—1947: H.E. Hazell
 1947—1956: E. G. Carter
 1956—1970: Ravi Somdutt
 1970—1970: Trevor C Kemp (acting)
 1970—1973: B. R. Pasricha
 1973—1974: Bhupendra Singh (acting)
 1974—1988: Shomie Ranjan Das
 1988—1995: Sumer B. Singh
 1995—1999: Harish Dhillon OS
 1999—2000: Rene A. Solomon (acting)
 2000—2003: Andrew Gray
 2003—2003 (May to September): Derek Mountford (acting)
Kirat Bhattal, actor
Papa CJ, stand-up comedian
 Shaad Ali, film director
 Pooja Bedi, actress and talk show host
Feroze Gujral, model
Siddharth Kak, film maker
Iqbal Khan, actor
Apoorva Lakhia, film maker
 Tarun Mansukhani, director and writer
 Rahul Roy, actor
 Parikshit Sahni, film and television actor
 Amar Talwar, actor
 Bikramjeet Kanwarpal, film and television actor
 Vir Das, actor and comedian
Varun Sharma, actor

Other

 Parveen Kumar, president of the British Medical Association.
 Iloosh Ahluwalia, artist

In fiction
In Rudyard Kipling's novel Kim (1901), a priest called Father Victor proposes that the central character, the boy Kim, should be sent to Sanawar, of which he says "It's miraculous beyond all whooping" and adds "We'll make a man of you at Sanawar - even at the price o' making you a Protestant".

Further reading
H. M. Lawrence, The Lawrence Military Asylum: being a brief account of the past ten years of the existence and progress of the institution established in the Himalayas by the late Sir H. M. Lawrence for the orphan and other children of European soldiers (1858; reissued by Kessinger Publishing, 2010)
Harish Dhillon, Rathin Mitra, Sanawar: the Lawrence School sesquicentenary, 1847-1997 (Lawrence School, Sanawar, 1997), 120 pp.
Manju Khan, K. J. Parel, Sanawar: a Legacy (Lawrence School, Sanawar, 1997) 248 pp.

See also
 Lawrence School, Lovedale

References

External links

Old Sanawarian Society Alumni website
Photo Gallery Historic School Album
Boarding Schools in India The Plenum School

Round Square schools
Member schools of the Headmasters' and Headmistresses' Conference
Boarding schools in Himachal Pradesh
High schools and secondary schools in Himachal Pradesh
Schools in Solan district
Educational institutions established in 1847
1847 establishments in British India
British-era buildings in Himachal Pradesh